Dillwynia retorta, commonly known as eggs and bacon, is a species of flowering plant shrub in the family Fabaceae and grows in New South Wales and Queensland. It is usually an erect shrub with thin, smooth, crowded leaves and yellow flowers with red markings.

Description
Flowering occurs from June to November.

Taxonomy
This species was first formally described as Pultenea retorta in 1799 by Johann Christoph Wendland and the description was published in Hortus Herrenhusanus. In 1917 George Druce changed the name to Dillwynia retorta and the change was published in  The Botanical Exchange Club and Society of the British Isles Report for 1916.

Distribution and habitat
Dillwynia retorta grows in heath and forest from south-east Queensland to the Budawang Range in southern New South Wales.

Ecology
It is a host plant for the jewel beetle species  Ethonion jessicae.

References 

retorta
Fabales of Australia
Flora of New South Wales
Flora of Queensland
Taxa named by Johann Christoph Wendland
Plants described in 1799